Red John  is a fictional character and the primary antagonist of the CBS crime drama The Mentalist for the first five seasons and in the first half of the sixth season. As a serial killer, he is believed to have begun his  killing spree in 1988, and has, with his operatives and acolytes, killed more than 70 people in California, Nevada, and Mexico. Five years prior to the action of the first episode, he murdered the wife and daughter of Patrick Jane (Simon Baker), making Jane his dedicated nemesis.

In the season-three finale, "Strawberries and Cream (Part 2)", Jane encounters a man (Timothy Carter, played by Bradley Whitford) in a shopping mall who convinces him he is Red John and whom he subsequently kills. However, after this cliffhanger episode, over the course of the first several episodes of season four, Jane determines that Carter, although a psychopathic killer himself, was not Red John, but one of the killer's many operatives.

In season five's "Red Sails in the Sunset", Lorelei Martins (Emmanuelle Chriqui), a Red John operative, who goes astray after Jane convinces her that Red John murdered her sister, Miranda, accidentally reveals to Jane that he has already met Red John and shaken his hand. Jane compiles a list of men whose hands he has shaken and eventually narrows the list to seven names. Lorelei, however, is captured by Red John, whom she refused to name to Jane, breaking a promise she had made, and reads a pre-mortem message from Red John threatening to go back to killing "a lot" until Jane captures Red John or vice versa. In Lorelei's message from Red John, she names the seven men Jane had narrowed down his list to include, indicating that somehow Red John has gotten inside Jane's mind, although Red John doesn't deny being one of the seven men.

In the season 6 episode "Red John", the eponymous serial killer's identity is revealed to be Thomas McAllister, the sheriff of Napa County, portrayed by Xander Berkeley. After unmasking himself to Patrick Jane, McAllister discloses that he is the founder and overall leader of the secret organization known as the Blake Association.

TV Guide included Red John in its 2013 list of "The 60 Nastiest Villains of All Time".

Character profile

Patrick Jane relentlessly pursues Red John, and ultimately in season 5 narrows his list of suspects to seven. The number of people in series who claim to have met "Red John" is limited. Although Patrick Jane learns that he has met Red John and shaken his hand at some point, he only discovers Red John's true identity midway through season 6.

Smiley face and other signatures

As part of his criminal signature, Red John draws a smiley face on the wall with the blood of the victim—always clockwise (except when it was portrayed in skywriting in "Red John's Footsteps"), using the three fingers of his rubber-gloved right hand. Jane says in the pilot episode, "Red John thinks of himself as a showman; an artist. He has a strong sense of theater ... the first thing that anyone sees is the face on the wall. You see the face first and you know. You know what's happened and you feel dread. Then, and only then, do you see the body of the victim. Always in that order."

Jane uses this information to work out that an apparent Red John murder was a copycat crime. Red John has twice painted his victim's toenails with their own blood. Both were female. The first was Patrick Jane's wife, Angela; Red John wanted to punish Jane for saying derogatory things about him during a TV interview. Years later, knowing the case would be intercepted by the California Bureau of Investigation team and that the reminder of his wife's death would make Jane furious, Red John painted the toenails of a young girl, to lead Jane into a trap.

Red John's victims have been mostly female, with some exceptions, such as Jared Renfrew (Todd Stashwick) in the season 1 episode "Red John's Friends", a man Jane helped to be released from prison on the condition he would give Jane information on the whereabouts of Red John. Fearing Red John, the man escaped Jane's custody before giving any relevant information. Later that day, the man contacted Jane to explain that he would be of no further assistance, although this doesn't save Renfrew's life. Jane used background noises from the conversation as a starting point to find this man, but Red John got to him first, killing both Renfrew and the prostitute Renfrew had been with. In the season 2 episode "His Red Right Hand", it is revealed another man was killed when he interrupted his wife's murder at the hand of Red John. Jane believes this occurred early in Red John's career and that Red John made a "mistake" due to his inexperience. Jane believes Red John removed the body from the crime scene (something he had otherwise not done) to bury the mistake. In the season 2 finale "Red Sky in the Morning", Red John and Jane meet when Red John rescues Jane from kidnappers; however Red John wears a mask that obscures his face. Red John also kills the two kidnappers, one of whom was male, but leaves alive a boy who the kidnappers blackmailed into looking like a criminal. In the season 4 episode "Blinking Red Light", Red John kills James Panzer, a blogger and serial killer known as the San Joaquin Killer, after Panzer has been goaded by Jane into insulting Red John on television. Jane did this because he could think of no other way to protect society from Panzer.

In the season 4 premiere "Scarlet Ribbons", Patrick Jane says that Red John's victims are “nearly all women, late at night, in their homes. He wakes them first, because he likes to see the fear in their eyes. He likes to hear them beg for mercy as he cuts them open."

In the season 2 episode "The Scarlet Letter", Jane tells Senior Special Agent Sam Bosco (Terry Kinney) that "Red John doesn't make mistakes. He doesn't leave clues. If you have new evidence, it's because he wants you to have it. The question isn't 'What does it mean?'; it's 'Why did he give it to you?'".

Bruno Heller, show's creator, has said that Red John isn't a "pathetic loser who is hiding out in a basement somewhere", and that Jane is "not fighting the Green River Killer. He's fighting Moriarty." In addition, "Jane and the audience are coming to the gradual realization that this is a much larger task than it seemed at first. It's like those Amazon tribesmen who throw spears at passing airplanes, then come to realize those planes are the seeds of a much larger civilization that is coming down on them." Like Moriarty, Red John has a network of agents, willing to kill or to die for him. In a radio interview Heller has also stated: "Red John is really just a personification of death, I mean it's that simple. Patrick Jane is very much alive and is very much about being alive in the face of death. And Red John is the fate that awaits us all in the end."

Tyger Tyger Conspiracy: The Blake Association

In season 2's finale episode "Red Sky in the Morning", a William Blake theme is introduced, when a person, who is believed at the time to be Red John, saves Patrick Jane from being killed under the direction of deranged slasher movie makers Ruth and Dylan. Jane is tied with saran wrap to a chair and, while he is immobilized, Red John recites the first verse of the William Blake poem "Tyger Tyger":

Tyger! Tyger! burning bright
In the forests of the night
What immortal hand or eye
Could frame thy fearful symmetry?

In subsequent episodes (season 3), Jane wonders about this but doesn't tell anyone that Red John recited it to him. In episode 9 of season 3 (“Red Moon”), serial cop killer Todd Johnson is burned alive. While in the ICU, with Jane the only person present, Johnson whispers in his dying breath "Tyger! Tyger!". This makes Jane conclude that there is a connection between Johnson and Red John, but he doesn't tell anyone about this either.

During subsequent episodes, it becomes clear that Red John either has an inside man in the CBI or is himself working within the CBI. In season 3's "Red Queen", the new director of the CBI, Gale Bertram (Michael Gaston), also recites William Blake. This time it's from another poem, called "A Cradle Song". The two lines he recites are:

And when thy little heart doth wake,
Then the dreadful night shall break

Jane is not present at the time of the reciting, but it is quite out of character for Bertram to recite poetry, and the fact that it is a poem by the same author is probably more than a simple coincidence. Bertram is later revealed to be among Jane's final list of Red John suspects.

In the season 3 finale, Jane tells the entire team all that he knows and recites the first verse of "Tyger Tyger". Kimball Cho knows the poem very well and recites the first two lines of the second verse:

In what distant deeps or skies
Burnt the fire of thine eyes?

When discussing what the poem means, Cho says, "Well, God made the lamb, but he also made the tiger. You can't have light without darkness. Life without death." This is also the mindset Red John's accomplices follow to act on his orders. In Cho's interpretation, he refers to a third, and earlier poem by William Blake, called "The Lamb" to which "Tyger Tyger" is a response or a further musing on the different parts of creation and the reasons for them, as started in "The Lamb". Actually, Blake himself refers to "The Lamb" in "Tyger! Tyger!", in the last line of the fifth verse: Did he who made the Lamb make thee?

In the season 6 episode "Red Listed", there is a revelation by Bob Kirkland (Kevin Corrigan) as to what "Tyger Tyger" means. Kirkland reveals to FBI agent Reede Smith (Drew Powell) that corrupt officials use the term "Tyger, Tyger" to cover up dirty work done under law enforcement. Smith pretends to know nothing about "Tyger Tyger" until he shoots Kirkland in the back six times when pretending to free him from a prison transfer, after which he tells the driver, who belongs to the same organization, "Tyger Tyger". The driver replies with the same phrase.

In the season 6 episode "The Red Tattoo", a woman named Kira Tinsley (Beth Riesgraf) is murdered by a man with a tattoo containing three dots – she reveals this to Jane in her final moments. Jane, believing that the man who killed Tinsley was Red John, gathers his five remaining Red John suspects into one location (in "Fire and Brimstone"), only to find that three of his suspects have the identical tattoo of three dots, revealing that they are all part of the "Tyger Tyger" group of corrupt officials.

In the season 6 episode "The Great Red Dragon", Smith decides to hand himself in after the same organization he is part of attempts to kill him, in the same way he killed Bob Kirkland. Once he is alone with Lisbon and Jane, he reveals that he is a member of The Blake Association (whose name is simultaneously first revealed), that they use the phrase "Tyger, Tyger" to identify fellow members, and that Red John is also a member of the Association. He explains how he came to join the Association after accidentally shooting a 12-year-old girl. The Association promised to clear his name and protect him if he agreed to join them and follow any instructions given to him, including murder.

Appearances, accomplices, and copycats

Face-to-face 

At the start of the series, Red John was initially known as simply a serial killer who tortured and murdered mostly women, with at least eleven confirmed victims by the series' premiere. However, Red John's persona would become much more mysterious as any individual who would come close to disclosing any crucial information regarding the killer to Jane would wind up dead themselves, implying that Red John is far more than just an average serial killer and has deep connections throughout the state. It would later be revealed that Red John has a multitude of followers that see him as a savior who gave their life a purpose and willingly aid him in his various plans and murders in gratitude for what he gives them, which can range from a new life, an occupation, or some form of compensation. His followers do not simply aid him, but worship him and willingly give their lives for his cause, refusing to ever reveal any information about their leader or how they met him. Jane soon realizes that Red John is more powerful than he could ever imagine, having connections in law enforcement and an entire cult of brainwashed followers under his complete control and at his beck and call.

The character of Red John himself remained largely unseen from the beginning. His face was confined in the shadows when he escaped from the abandoned house in the first-season finale. He may have appeared as a slim, dark-haired California Highway Patrol motorcycle officer (blue turtleneck, rather than blue tie) to poison Rebecca using his left hand in "His Red Right Hand"; in the same episode, he is also seen in flashback. In the second-season finale, "Red Sky in the Morning", a man claiming to be Red John appears in the flesh, wearing a black sweatshirt, apron and pants, black rubber gloves, a pair of charcoal boots, and a grotesque rubber mask that covers his face, making him look slightly similar to what many believe the real life serial killer Jack the Ripper donned during his murder hunts. In the episode, Red John saves Jane from two student filmmakers who had copycatted Red John murders.

During the encounter, Red John keeps his face hidden behind a mask, preventing Jane from identifying him. Before leaving Jane, Red John recites the first stanza of "The Tyger" by William Blake (see above). This poem is alluded to numerous times throughout the series, before and after its reveal to Jane, with its contents making up the backbone of Red John's philosophy (implying the reason for why it is his favorite poem) of there being no such thing as life without death or light without darkness, something he tells his followers to get them into the correct mindset for their murders and exploits.

There have been further developments in season 5. In "Red Sails in the Sunset", Lorelei Martins reveals, in a moment of pique, that Red John is someone Jane knows by telling him that he and Red John are very much alike and she is surprised that they didn't become best friends "as soon as they shook hands". This prompts Jane to compile a list of men he has shaken hands with, which would eventually be narrowed down to seven names.

Todd Johnson and Red John impersonator 

In the episode "Red Moon", Jane exposes an EMT, Todd Johnson (Josh Braaten), as a serial cop killer. After being locked in a holding cell in the CBI headquarters, Johnson says he will only talk to Jane, as he claims only Jane will understand what he has to say. When the guard returns with Jane, Johnson has been set aflame and is writhing on fire. On his deathbed, Johnson says "Tyger Tyger" to Jane, indicating he is in some way connected to Red John. The reason behind Todd Johnson's cop killings is left unclear, but later seasons along with Johnson's knowledge of the phrase "Tyger, Tyger" would imply that their deaths were in some way connected to the "Blake Association". Red John most likely ordered Johnson to murder various police officers who were close to discovering his society or were members themselves (perhaps indicating why one of Johnson's victims was burned alive, probably in order to hide the organization's tattoo, which is marked on all members to better ensure loyalty) who failed to complete their orders or were planning on turning themselves, and the association by extension, over to the authorities.

When Johnson realized that Red John would never let him live while he was in custody and surrounded by potentially corrupt officials, he was prepared to reveal everything he knew to Jane, before he himself is killed by another Red John operative, but still managed to utter the society's main form of communication to Jane. Jane then begins a secret investigation of his own to track the killer. Red John, in the meantime, decides to exploit the opportunity to use Johnson's murder as a means to target another individual close to Jane and additionally cover up the identity of Johnson's true killer, who also served as his secret informant on the CBI. Meanwhile, Special Agent J.J. LaRoche (Pruitt Taylor Vince) begins rigorously working to find Johnson's killer. He ultimately suspects Supervising Agent Madeleine Hightower (Aunjanue Ellis), due to DNA evidence that Jane believes has been planted by Red John or one of his accomplices. With Jane's help, Hightower stages a hostile escape and is advised by Jane to remain in hiding, not only to evade the police but due to the danger imposed by Red John. Hightower goes to stay with her sister.

In the season 3 finale, "Strawberries and Cream – Part 2", the mole is identified as Grace Van Pelt's fiancé, FBI Agent Craig O'Laughlin (played by Eric Winter); O'Laughlin attempts to assassinate Hightower and instead shoots Lisbon, and is then himself shot dead by Hightower and Van Pelt in tandem. Gale Bertram (Michael Gaston) leaves the mall in a huff over Jane's wasting of his time. Jane, on a call with Lisbon during the shootout, tells her to use O'Laughlin's cell phone to redial the last number and tell the one who answered that O'Laughlin is dead. When Lisbon does so, a phone rings near Jane and is answered by a man (Timothy Carter, played by Bradley Whitford) reading a newspaper and speaking in an odd, high-pitched voice. After ending the call, Jane approaches the man and questions him. At first, the man appears upset and threatens to call security, but then smiles and says he was joking and claims he is Red John. The two talk; the man reveals to Jane that he has a gun concealed in a folded newspaper and states that he is tired of killing and wants to start a new life, and encourages Jane to do the same. Jane says he will not be able to move on until Red John is dead. The man begins to leave, but at Jane's insistence answers a question, revealing details about Jane's wife and daughter that Jane mistakenly presumes only Red John could know. Jane vengefully shoots Carter with a gun he has hidden in his pocket. In season 4, Carter is shown to have been a Red John operative imposter.

Red John still at large 

In reference to the season 3 finale, the series creator, Bruno Heller, has stated: "What you get from that scene is what you should get. The viewer is supposed to be convinced. Patrick Jane is certain it's Red John... The thing is, Red John is a master of the mind game. If Red John wanted to die, maybe this is how he wanted to die. Or maybe he just wants Jane to think he's dead."

In the season 4 premiere it is revealed that Ron Deutsch, the bald security officer at the mall, was a Red John operative who removed crucial evidence from the scene. Jane comes to believe the man he shot was not Red John, but Timothy Carter, a sadistic businessman who, with his equally twisted wife, Sally, had kidnapped a young woman, Debbie Lupin, in whose search the couple cynically pretended to join. Jane tricks Sally into revealing Lupin's location and Sally is arrested by Lisbon and taken into custody, not to be heard from again as she commits suicide in jail. Jane convinces a jury that Carter was Red John and is acquitted, although Jane is already beginning to have doubts about that.

In "Little Red Book", Lisbon arranges a meeting with Agent J.J. LaRoche, who is apparently leaving Major Crimes, to see Sally Carter, who committed suicide by slitting her wrists with a sharpened spoon, leaving a note about how lost she was now that her "God" (by which she presumably means Timothy Carter) is dead. But Jane, still not satisfied Carter was Red John, brings Rosalind Harker, the blind woman who had a relationship with Red John, to identify Carter's body. She feels his face and told him that she had never met the man before, confirming Jane's suspicion that Red John is "still out there somewhere".

James Panzer and Susan Darcy's investigation 

By the episode "Blinking Red Light", it is now widely believed that Red John is dead, with Jane and Lisbon the only ones aware he is still alive. One of the people believing Red John to be dead is James Panzer, a blogger pretending to devote his life to find a serial killer known as "the San Joaquin Killer" (abbreviated SJK, who has killed at least five young women). In reality, Panzer is the killer. Jane suspects Panzer but initially lacks the proof to expose him. When he and Panzer both appear on Karen Cross's television talk show discussing the SJK case, Jane recognizes Panzer has to be stopped  and goads Panzer into comparing Red John unfavorably to SJK. Panzer rises to the bait, making bold statements that the SJK killings were the work of a genius and Red John by comparison is a "common sociopath, lazy, sloppy, delusional" and already forgotten since Jane killed him. Panzer then makes the same mistake made by Jane and Kristina Frye: belittling Red John in a public forum. A couple of hours after the television appearance, Panzer is found murdered, with Red John's smiley face painted in blood on one of the walls near his body. Panzer's murder proves Jane's theory that Red John is still alive. This makes Panzer Red John's ninth male victim.

By the episode "Always Bet on Red", the FBI had investigated Panzer's murder and believed that a copycat of Red John was now active. The agent in charge, Susan Darcy (Catherine Dent), begins pressing Jane for confirmation that he did kill Red John. At this time, Red John is shown to be stalking Darcy via an uploaded video called "I Dare You" on the Major Crime server, which shows her in her apartment, unaware that she is being filmed. The cameraman uploads an infobox saying, "She's cute, this is going to be fun". Jane reluctantly frames the late Thomas Maier, father of Panzer's first victim, for killing Panzer as revenge for SJK's victims – Maier had recently committed suicide. The FBI closes the case, presumably leaving Darcy safe, as she will presumably drop her inquiry.

In the episode "Red is the New Black", Jane's efforts are later exposed and undone when Darcy refuses to let the case go after finding too many discrepancies. Darcy interviews Rosalind Harker, Red John's blind ex-girlfriend and also the attendant of the morgue that Timothy Carter's body was taken to following his death. Darcy subsequently realizes that Red John was still alive even though Jane has kept up the deception. Later, Harker contacts Jane and happily reveals Red John, once again under the alias "Roy Tagliaferro", has come to visit her for tea, promising to "sort things out" with Jane and Darcy. As Harker speaks on the phone, a slim man, holding a tea cup in his left hand, and dressed in a smart, dark-coloured suit, is sitting nearby; Harker, when asked, confirms that "Roy" is present and listening.

Jane, fearing Red John will kill Harker, alerts Lisbon and Darcy, and they proceed to her house with an FBI SWAT team. Upon arrival, they find Harker alive and unhurt, playing her piano alone, seemingly sad that Red John "couldn't stay". Darcy notices a blood trail leading to a nearby closet, which, when opened, reveals the murdered body of the morgue attendant, confirming that Red John is still alive, either following Darcy or with access to the information in her files and/or her comings and goings. All of the Red John files were delivered to Darcy by CBI Director Wainwright, himself killed shortly thereafter by Darcy assuming it was Red John in the car speaking to Jane.

Ninth anniversary of Jane's wife and daughter's death 

In the season 4's penultimate episode "Red Rover, Red Rover", Jane receives a message from Red John: an envelope with the words "Happy Anniversary" under the wiper of his car. In the cemetery where Jane's wife and daughter are buried, a little girl named Hailey (Emma Rayne Lyle) approaches him and says, "Hello, Patrick." When Patrick asks how she knows his name, she says, "Your friend told me," and reveals the red smiley-face painted on her hand. She says, "He told me to ask you a question ... 'Do you give up yet?'" Hailey tells Patrick the man is white, was wearing a baseball cap, and had an odd voice. Lisbon says to Patrick that Red John wants to play with his mind. Later in the episode, Patrick burns all the CBI files of Red John, presumably out of despair, and the next morning says, "He's right... it's time to give up ... nothing's working. Nothing. It's just a game, and he keeps winning. The only way for me to stop him is if I stop playing."

Jane's breakdown and Red John's proposal 

In season 4's finale "The Crimson Hat", after being fired from the CBI, Jane finds himself in a Las Vegas bar, where he meets an attractive woman named Lorelei (Emmanuelle Chriqui). He gets arrested. Lorelei bails him out, and the two have sex in Jane's apartment. The next day, Lorelei reveals herself as an associate of Red John and says her presence in Jane's life is "a gift". She brings forward Red John's proposal for friendship and a "change" in Jane's lifestyle to help him overcome his depression. Jane is shocked and tells Lorelei to get out. However, he later confides to Lisbon that his breakdown had been tailored to get Red John to believe Patrick was really giving up. Red John communicates through Lorelei that he will only meet Jane in person if he kills Lisbon and brings him her head as a "present". The CBI team executes a plot where they fake the murders of Lisbon and Rigsby at the hands of Jane, and the team goes into hiding. On hearing this over the news, Red John sends a message to Jane to meet him in Nevada. Darcy is investigating the apparent deaths of Lisbon and Rigsby. She discovers that the body found does not belong to Rigsby and gets arrest warrants issued against the entire team involved in the deception.

Meanwhile, a limousine pulls over in the middle of a deserted street where Jane is waiting. Lorelei and a huge, armed man emerge from the car, and she claims Red John is inside. Lorelei looks at the box Jane is bearing and asks if it contains a football or a cabbage. He tells her it is a melon, specifically a honeydew. She does not react angrily, apparently since Red John (and thus she) became aware of Jane's deception. Lorelei does have her assistant beat Jane up "a little". Jane sits in the front seat of the limo while a dark, shadowy figure sitting in the back whose voice is distorted with a radio transmitter, and whose face is not visible, greets Jane. He tells Jane that he was fooled for a while by Jane's plot but was apprised of the truth by a "good friend" inside the FBI. At this moment, Lisbon and her team, who were to move in and arrest Red John, are arrested by Darcy and her squad. Lisbon, cuffed on the side of the road, tells Darcy about the plan and the imminent danger to Jane's life. Just as Lorelei is about to reluctantly punish Jane by cutting off two of his fingers, the CBI and FBI teams arrive. Jane emerges unharmed. The FBI fired bullets at the fleeing limousine, which stops. Lorelei is arrested unhurt, although the driver/bodyguard is killed. Darcy opens the back door, which reveals CBI Director Luther Wainwright, bound and dead, with a pay-as-you-go (burner) phone attached to his body. Lorelei is interrogated at the CBI by Jane and Lisbon. She refuses to speak about Red John but tells Lisbon that she and Jane have been lovers, calling each other "lover" frequently. Jane tells Lorelei that she will eventually reveal what she knows and walks out of the room, ending season 4.

Lorelei Martins 

In the season 5 episode "Red Sails in the Sunset", Lorelei Martins reappears in a women's prison, having been removed from CBI custody by the FBI. She remains loyal to Red John and when Jane, with the aid of Bret Stiles (Malcolm McDowell), has her broken out of prison, she expresses shock and disappointment that her liberator is Jane, not Red John. Jane discovers Lorelei had a sister who was murdered some years prior. Lisbon faxes him a photo of the crime scene where the word "ROY" can be seen scrawled on the floor next to the sister's body – information that had been withheld from the public at the time of the murder. This suggests to Jane that Red John (who has used the alias Roy Tagliaferro) was the killer, a fact that Jane reveals to Lorelei, who, angry at an earlier deception by Jane, tells him that "you're just like him, you know that? Relentless manipulation... I only wonder why the two of you didn't become lifelong friends from the moment you shook hands." This slip of Lorelei suggests that Jane has met Red John in the past. However, Lorelei refuses to believe Jane about the murderer. Alerted to Jane's whereabouts, the CBI begins to close in on the pair, but Jane allows Lorelei to escape, telling her to "find the truth" for herself and come back to him when she realizes Red John used her.

Lorelei reappears in episode 16 of season 5, "There Will Be Blood", which reveals two new accomplices of Red John – well-regarded citizens Julia Howard and Jason Lennon – an employee and a trustee of a women's shelter, respectively. Lorelei tortures Julia to obtain information about her sister's death and then kills her after a brutal beating. When Lorelei comes after Lennon, Jane appears to try to rescue Lennon (for Jane's own ends) and acknowledge Lennon and Red John's involvement in Miranda Martins' murder. Lorelei shoots Lennon, critically wounding him. After kissing Jane, she departs on a mission to kill Red John, breaking her pact to reveal Red John's identity. She tells Jane she has done "much worse [than breaking a promise]", and that she and Jane are both going to hell "on two different roads". Two weeks later, Lennon is revealed to have survived the shooting, although in a coma, while Lorelei is found dead under Red John's smiley face with Homeland Security and police at the scene. Jane apologizes to her corpse but, still peeved over Lorelei's breaking her promise to identify Red John, tells Lisbon (of Lorelei), "She had it coming."

Visualize 

In the fifth season episode "The Red Barn", it is hinted that Red John may currently be or was a member of the "Visualize Self-Realization Center" church, a notorious cult with a reputation for brainwashing its members, as two bodies which fit his MO were found on a farm previously controlled by Visualize, complete with his signature smiley face on the outside of the barn where the bodies were found. The murders are revealed to have been committed over two decades ago, when various Visualize members worked on the farm until its eventual shutdown due to a lack of farming expertise, and ten years before Red John was an active serial killer who targeted predominantly women. This implies that Red John used the cult and its techniques to recruit individuals who would make suitable followers (as many of Visualize's members come from broken families and traumatic childhoods, a trait that nearly every single Red John operative also shares), then brainwashes or seduces them to effectively control them. This finally explains how Red John recruited so many followers over the years who worshipped him and who were willing to give their lives for his plans.

Rebecca Anderson, a loyal Red John operative who murdered Sam Bosco and his team under his orders before she is killed by Red John, reveals that Red John "opened her eyes to the truth" and enabled her to see the world for what it really was. This is similar to Visualize's motto of opening up potential members' eyes to the truth in order to effectively recruit them, implying that Red John uses the same philosophy to recruit his followers. Visualize is also known for teaching its members various and diverse skills, such as bomb manufacturing and advanced technology and computer uses, skills that Red John himself and many of his followers also display throughout the series. In a later episode, a private investigator named Kira Tinsley, who was hired by Red John to spy on the CBI, mentions that it was a Visualize member that hired her, confirming that Red John is indeed still a functioning member of the organization. The leader of the cult, Bret Stiles, has shown in previous seasons that he has a very thorough grasp on Red John's inner workings, hinting at a connection between the two, which seems to finally be revealed as Visualize. Whether Bret Stiles actually knows the identity of Red John appears to be debatable throughout the series, but subsequent episodes imply that, although Stiles may know Red John is connected to his organization, he does not know which member he currently is and simply uses his own resources to keep tabs on the killer's activities.

Bob Kirkland and Homeland Security 

Robert "Bob" Kirkland, introduced in the retcon episode "Red Dawn", has engaged in numerous suspicious activities relating to Jane and Jane's search for Red John. In flashback just after Jane has joined the CBI, a man is seen thanking FBI Director Alexa Shultz for asking Virgil Minelli to keep the FBI updated on the Red John investigation. A couple of episodes later, the man reappears. He identifies himself as Homeland Security Agent Bob Kirkland, telling Lisbon that the Tommy Volker matter is being handled and that she should "take a step back".

After he leaves her office, he comes upon Jane. The two shake hands, and Kirkland tells Jane that he knows him, although Jane didn't know Kirkland. In the next episode, Lorelei Martins tells Jane that he had already met and shaken hands with Red John. In the episodes "Red Sails in the Sunset" and "There Will Be Blood", Kirkland and Homeland Security are shown taking  a deep interest in finding Red John's accomplice, Lorelei Martins, when she goes on a killing spree. Neither the CBI nor Homeland Security locate Lorelei before she is found murdered under Red John's trademark smiley face. When Jason Lennon (who admitted to being an accomplice of Red John) awakes from an induced coma, he is interviewed by Kirkland. He tells Kirkland that he remembers who shot him but says he does not recognize Kirkland. Kirkland then kills Lennon with an injection, making it appear Lennon has died of his injuries. Kirkland tells Jane that Lennon "never said a word" before dying.

In the episode "Red Letter Day", Kirkland has two Homeland Security agents break into the attic where Jane works (and occasionally lives) at CBI. They take pictures of the information on Red John that Jane has on display. Kirkland is able to reproduce a near-exact version of Jane's bulletin board on Red John, presumably including the references to Kirkland himself as a suspect. Jane had suspicions that he was being watched and realizes that his room has been broken into because he sees the toothpick he had been leaving of late between the door and the frame lying on the floor where it fell after Kirkland's men entered the premises, never noticing it.

Kirkland reappears in episode 4 of season 6. He is revealed to be responsible for killing names on a list of fake Red John suspects his men stole from Jane. Once he learns that the list was fake from Jane, he kidnaps him. At the barn where he is being held captive, it is also shown that Richard Haibach is there, one of the men suspected of being the "San Joaquin Killer." Jane is saved by Hightower and Lisbon, and Kirkland is arrested. On his way to prison, his vehicle is pulled over by FBI Agent Reede Smith. Smith informs him that the "Tyger, Tyger" quote is used by dirty officers of California Law Enforcement. Smith is one of them. When he gives Kirkland the address to a safe house, he then shoots him to death while running to his freedom. He and the driver cover it up and before departing say, "Tyger, Tyger." While Kirkland originally monitored Jane through his connections in the FBI and researched Red John on his own accord, Kirkland's findings into the existence of this criminal organization enabled him to authorize Homeland Security to openly investigate Red John, as he is a suspected member of the organization, which could pose a threat to national security and commit acts of terrorism.

The seven suspects 

In the fifth season finale, Jane reveals to Lisbon that he has narrowed the Red John suspect list to seven names. Although those names aren't revealed until the end of the episode, Jane and the CBI investigate a Red John murder. Although it was initially believed that Red John wasn't involved in the murder and that it was either the victim's husband or uncle, it is revealed that Red John committed the murder with the help of Miriam Gottlieb, a social worker who wanted Eileen Turner's child. Gottlieb tricked Turner into separating herself from her volatile husband and moving into a motel, where Red John struck. In transit after her arrest, Gottlieb commits suicide by swallowing a cyanide pill, refusing, like almost all Red John's operatives, to be taken alive. Before her arrest, she gave Jane a DVD from Red John, which featured the now-dead Lorelei Martins, who recorded a video shortly before her own murder by Red John. Martins reveals that Red John is very angry with her for revealing that Patrick and Red John had shaken hands, and that, in exchange for her making the recording, Red John will not "make her suffer so much". The video reveals that Red John somehow knows the names of Patrick Jane's seven suspects:

Red John doesn't deny being one of these men. The killing of Eileen Turner marks the beginning of a new killing spree as Lorelei tells Jane that Red John will "start killing again ... often" until either Jane catches him, or he catches Jane. Out of frustration, Jane breaks the DVD with his own fingers, and sighs while looking out his window of his room at CBI.

The final hunt 

In the premiere of season 6, Jane is highly disturbed at how Red John could deduce who he would have on his final list two months before finishing it, as well as have so much intimate knowledge of his memories and thought process. At a loss as to what to do, Jane remains extremely cautious around the seven suspects while Lisbon goes behind his back and has all the suspects' cell phones installed with GPS trackers.

Infuriated that Lisbon went behind his back and played into Red John's hands, Jane and Lisbon have a falling out, with Lisbon eventually going to an abandoned house after receiving an anonymous tip at 5570 West Huron Street. She calls SAC-PD; however, when she arrives at the address, a lady on the line informs her that they are temporarily unavailable. She then hears a faint scream inside and enters. Inside, she finds the mutilated body of Brett Partridge, chanting "Tyger, Tyger", before dying, effectively revealing that he is not Red John. It is revealed that Red John called in the anonymous tip, abducted and placed Partridge within the house to torture and murder him, knowing that Lisbon was tracking the suspects' phones and would arrive after learning that Partridge was in the house. He abducts her and then uses her phone to call Jane, who has previously been attempting to call Lisbon to apologize for their earlier argument, and taunts him as he paints his signature smiley-face on her face with Partridge's blood.

However, Jane and the authorities locate Lisbon, who seems to have been left unscathed by Red John, confusing her and Jane. As Jane ponders how Red John could have such intimate knowledge into his past and memories, he concludes that Red John must have had access to someone with such knowledge: Sophie Miller, Jane's old psychiatrist, who helped him regain his mental health after he suffered a breakdown in the wake of his family's murder. After repeated attempts to communicate with Sophie fail, Jane visits her house, only to find her severed head in the kitchen oven, revealing her to be one of Red John's victims.

As it is revealed that Red John stole Sophie's personal files on her patients, Jane concludes that Red John most likely came to her in the guise of a patient in order to ply her for knowledge. However, Red John didn't know that Sophie used an audio device to record her thoughts about her patients, using her unique ability to read people even if they attempt to hide their true emotions and personality. Locating an entry dedicated to a man with the last name "Roth" (a word meaning 'red'), Red John's alias when visiting Sophie, Jane listens to a detailed description of Red John's inner workings; he seems to have a case of acrophobia, and/or other phobias, is middle aged, is in good health, has no family but many friends, is a great speaker, has good posture, is an excellent whistler, possesses hints of narcissism, and seems to be harboring something dark within himself. With this knowledge, Jane is one step ahead of Red John with an additional description to narrow down his list of six suspects.

The Blake Association 
Knowing about the tattoo and using it as his leverage, Jane plans to gather the remaining five suspects at his old house where he has ammunition. He plans to attract each suspect individually, telling them he has critical information about Red John. Jane promises Lisbon that she can accompany him during this process, but breaks his promise as he is worried about her safety. Once the five suspects are together, Jane tells them that one of them is Red John. He pulls out his shotgun and asks that they all put their guns on the floor. He then reveals what Tinsley told him about the tattoo and asks the men to reveal their left shoulders. First to reveal is Raymond Haffner and Bret Stiles, who do not have tattoos. Sheriff Thomas McAllister reveals his arm and his tattoo, three dots, just as Tinsley described. Jane moves in to take a closer look at whom he now believes is the real Red John before Bret Stiles indicates for him to look at Gale Bertram and Reede Smith, who both have the same tattoo as the sheriff. Now that three men have identical tattoos, a new window is opened to identify who Red John is; and whether Red John also has the tattoo. It is believed that the men who have these tattoos are all corrupt government officials who use the "Tyger, Tyger" phrase to cover up their unlawful work.

As Jane gathers them in his home, the house explodes with all five Red John suspects and Jane still inside. Police arrive, and Lisbon enters the house to discover Reede Smith. She identifies the tattoo and shoots Smith, wounding him, but he escapes. Lisbon then sees Bertram and tells him Smith is Red John. Bertram slips away as only Jane at this point knows he has the tattoo. An unconscious Jane is asleep at the hospital and Bertram attempts to kill him before being interrupted by Lisbon. As Jane begins to regain consciousness, Bertram flees and Lisbon and Jane deduce that either Bertram or Smith is Red John. It is also revealed through DNA testing that the other Red John suspects were killed in the blast, although no bodies were seen. Jane and Lisbon then realize that Brett Partridge was chanting the phrase "Tyger, Tyger" to Lisbon just prior to his death, in the hope that she was a member and could help him. When Agent Cho checks Partridge's body at the morgue to verify the tattoo confirming that he was a Blake member, he learns that Red John peeled away the section of skin on his shoulder where the tattoo would have been located, implying that Partridge was a member and Red John had attempted to cover up his affiliation to the group. While Smith attempts to recover from his wound, the corrupt law enforcement organization he is a part of attempts to kill him before the CBI finds him, fearful that he will reveal their secrets. After two attempts are made on his life, Smith decides to hand himself in to the CBI in exchange for protection, where he reveals that he joined the Blake Association after accidentally killing a twelve-year-old girl as a result of paranoia induced by pain medication he was addicted to at the time, eventually being cleared of the crime due to his ties with the Blake Association.

Since then, Smith has been a member of the group, helping fellow associates cover their own illegal acts, while developing more and more guilt over his own actions. The name of the group and its code are derived from William Blake and his famous poem "The Tyger", implying that whoever controls the organization is an admirer of Blake's work. Smith further reveals that Red John is part of the association, which was how he managed to poison Rebecca, one of his followers when she killed Bosco and his entire unit, as well as how he managed to have so many connections throughout law enforcement. Jane then looks Smith in the eye and asks him if he killed his wife and daughter, at which point Smith states that he did not. This prompts Jane to reveal at a press conference that Red John is Gale Bertram, who has since gone on the run with the aid of a fellow Blake associate named Oscar. While hiding from the authorities, Bertram brutally murders a bartender who comes close to recognizing him on the news reports and evades capture by posing as a SWAT officer as other units, many of which he called in himself, arrive, allowing him to escape unseen in Oscar's vehicle. With so much corruption being revealed to have infiltrated California's law enforcement agencies, along with Bertram seemingly revealed as Red John, an out of state FBI team led by Special Agent Dennis Abbot from Austin, Texas, is sent to disband the CBI, at which point Jane decides to "let go" but tells Lisbon he hasn't quit in his hunt for Red John.

The reveal and death of Red John
The next day, as the FBI cleans out the CBI headquarters, Jane receives a phone call from Bertram, who is still on the run with the aid of Oscar, but cuts their conversation short when a police officer at the gas station he is calling from recognizes Bertram. Before the officer can arrest him, Oscar shoots the officer dead and escapes with Bertram.  Jane bides his time until Bertram calls him again, wishing to meet him to gain a sense of closure and believing that their rivalry has ended in an honorable tie. Jane gets Bertram to meet him in the chapel at the cemetery where his wife and daughter are buried. Taking Lisbon's gun and escaping from the FBI as they attempt to arrest him, Jane meets Bertram at the chapel after being disarmed by Oscar and learns that Bertram is not Red John. Bertram reveals that he is not even a high-ranking member of the Blake Association and it is Red John who is one of the high members. He does not know who Red John is but was ordered to lure Jane to a meeting so that he can be killed. He then orders Oscar to kill Jane.

However, Oscar, also under orders from Red John, shoots Bertram dead as the real Red John enters the chapel: Sheriff Thomas McAllister. McAllister thanks Oscar and then instructs him to leave to give him and Jane time to talk. As Jane asks why Bertram had to die, McAllister reveals that, as the world now believes Bertram to be Red John, it would be a fitting end for Jane to end up dying with his supposed nemesis. The killer reveals that he has been the secret power controlling the Blake Association, having started it many years ago, and has been manipulating its thousands of members with their secrets and illegal acts, using his favorite poet, William Blake, and his poem "The Tyger" as inspiration for the name of the society and its inner communications. With this secret organization at his disposal, in conjunction with the dozens of loyal followers he recruited, seduced, and brainwashed through Visualize, McAllister formed connections all over the state to spy for him, tamper with evidence, commit murders, and aid in his plans of building up his society and cult, as well as targeting Jane and people close to him.

While Red John gloats over his victories, Jane reveals that he knows how McAllister survived the explosion back at his home: he brought two bombs. One was a concussion bomb that knocked out everyone in the room, at which point McAllister dragged Jane, Bertram, and Smith away from the more deadly bomb. McAllister then brought in a dead body from the trunk of his car, which had its DNA records swapped with those of McAllister's courtesy of Brett Partridge, a member of the Blake Association whose job gave him access to the DNA primary data base and was later murdered by McAllister for knowing too much. This body was placed next to Stiles and Haffner, both of whom perished in the explosion, leaving only Jane, Smith, and Bertram alive, while McAllister escaped before the authorities arrived. McAllister knew that either Smith or Bertram would be accused of being Red John as they would be the only remaining suspects with ties to the Blake Association. McAllister had then ordered for Smith to be killed before CBI could arrest him and had Bertram (anonymously through the Blake Association) lure Jane to a final meeting before Bertram was to escape the country, while also secretly ordering Oscar to aid the former CBI director and ensure his safety until Jane arrived, at which point he was to kill Bertram.

Before McAllister can kill Jane, Jane hands him a handful of bread crumbs and releases a pigeon from his jacket, startling McAllister, who had displayed a phobia of the creatures in a previous episode. This revealed that Jane knew McAllister was Red John before meeting Bertram and deduced his phobia, which Sophia Miller previously speculated on (also implying why he was unable to kill Lisbon previously as the house they were in during the season premiere contained pigeons). Jane then snatches a gun he taped underneath one of the pews the previous day and shoots McAllister in the torso and Oscar dead when he enters to stop Jane; McAllister begs Jane not to kill him. As Jane revels in finally knowing who his nemesis is and having him at his mercy, a startled woman enters the chapel and asks Jane to stop. As Jane tries to calm the woman and get her to leave, she reveals herself to be another of Red John's agents and attempts to slit Jane's throat with a knife. Jane knocks out the woman with a candle stand and, realizing that McAllister escaped during the commotion, leaves the chapel to chase the killer.

After being pursued through the cemetery, a neighborhood, and a playground, McAllister loses his stamina near a small pond and dials 911. Jane kicks his nemesis, knocking the phone away from him, and grasps the man's throat. As McAllister claims that he knew who would be on Jane's final list of suspects because he is a real psychic, Jane asks him two final questions to determine his honesty by looking at his eyes. Asking McAllister to blink once for no and two for yes, Jane asks if he is sorry for murdering his wife and daughter and if he is afraid to die; McAllister blinks twice to both questions. Satisfied with his answers, Jane then strangles McAllister to death.

References

The Mentalist characters
Fictional serial killers
Television characters introduced in 2008
Fictional characters from San Francisco Bay Area
Fictional sheriffs
Napa County, California
American male characters in television
Fictional murderers of children